Buittle railway station, also known as Buittle Halt, Buittle Mill and Buittle Mill Halt, served the civil parish of Buittle, Dumfries and Galloway, Scotland from 1862 to 1894 on the Castle Douglas and Dumfries Railway.

History 
The station opened in July 1862 by the Glasgow and South Western Railway. Trains only called here on Wednesday with one in each direction. It was known as Buittle Mill in the local press. The station closed on 1 August 1894 when the line was doubled.

References

External links 

Disused railway stations in Dumfries and Galloway
Railway stations in Great Britain opened in 1862
Railway stations in Great Britain closed in 1894
Former Glasgow and South Western Railway stations
1862 establishments in Scotland
1894 disestablishments in Scotland